Maratus vespertilio is a species of the genus Maratus (peacock spiders), an Australian member of the jumping spider family. Males expand their colorful abdominal flaps for display during courtship as well as in contests with other males.

References

Salticidae
Spiders of Australia
Spiders described in 1901